MSI Wind may refer to:
 MSI Wind Netbook, a laptop computer
 MSI Wind PC, a desktop computer